Shams Sumon is a Bangladeshi actor. He won the Bangladesh National Film Award for Best Supporting Actor for the film Sopnopuron.

Works
 Joyjatra (2004)

References

External links
 

Living people
Bangladeshi male film actors
Bangladeshi male television actors
Best Supporting Actor National Film Award (Bangladesh) winners
Place of birth missing (living people)
Date of birth missing (living people)
Year of birth missing (living people)